Shandong (17) is a Chinese aircraft carrier that was launched on 26 April 2017 for the People's Liberation Army Navy (PLAN) of the People's Republic of China. Shandongs class was initially suspected to be designated Type 001A (as Liaoning received the designation Type 001) but was revealed to be Type 002 at its commissioning ceremony. The class received the NATO reporting name Kuznetsov Mod. ("modified").

History

Construction
Shandong was constructed by the Dalian Shipbuilding Industry, part of the China Shipbuilding Industry Corporation, in Dalian, Liaoning province, China. According to the state Xinhua News Agency, manufacture began in November 2013 and laid down the keel for its hull in a dry dock beginning in March 2015. 

The Chinese government did not publicly confirm the ship's existence until construction was well underway. Satellite imagery for the defense analysis industry showed the aircraft carrier in the early stages of hull assembly by March 2015. Public photos of a hull with military characteristics at the Dalian shipyard surfaced on the internet the next month. In October 2015, the first definitive signs of the vessel's role appeared when construction of a hangar deck began on the hull. In December 2015, a Chinese defense ministry spokesman confirmed that the ship was an aircraft carrier, stating that the design and construction work was under way.

In May 2016, the ski-jump takeoff ramp was noted to be close to installation. The ship's island superstructure was fabricated in two parts: the nine-deck forward half, containing the bridge and main mast, was installed by September of that year; the aft half, with the funnel and air intakes, was installed in the weeks that followed. By the end of 2016, the ship was substantially structurally complete.

Outfitting

Following the launch, the carrier was fitted-out and underwent early tests of the propulsion system. The dockside system trials began after the out-fitting was completed in November 2017.

At the time of its launch, the ship was not expected to be delivered to PLAN until 2020; however, successful early tests put the project ahead of schedule and media reports indicated that it could enter the navy fleet in 2019. While its predecessor CNS  has been used largely as a training ship since it entered active service in 2012, the Type 002 is expected to be used in regular military operational service.

Sea trials 
The first sea trial of the carrier took place in May 2018 in the Bohai Sea. This was followed by eight more trials through November 2019 for a total of about 19 months before the carrier was commissioned. The ninth and final sea trial, which commenced from 14 November 2019, was conducted simultaneously with a training exercise in South China Sea. The dates and durations of the sea trials are as follow:

 First sea trial: 13–18 May 2018
 Second sea trial: 26 August – 4 September 2018
 Third sea trial: 28 October – 6 November 2018
 Fourth sea trial: 27 December 2018 – 8 January 2019
 Fifth sea trial: 27 February – 4 March 2019
 Sixth sea trial: 25–31 May 2019
 Seventh sea trial: 1–4 August 2019 and 6–22 August 2019
 Eighth sea trial: 15–20 October 2019
 Ninth sea trial: from 14 November 2019 (end date unknown)

The arresting gear was installed on 11 September 2018 after the second sea trial. This was immediately followed by flight tests of the J-15, Z-18 and Z-9 on 14 September 2018. J-15D, the electronic warfare (EW) version of the aircraft, was also spotted on deck on 9 October 2018.

Commissioning 
The carrier was commissioned on 17 December 2019 at Sanya, Hainan by Central Military Commission chairman Xi Jinping and was officially named Shandong. After commissioning, according to Chinese media Shandong reached in October 2020 initial operating capability (IOC) or basic standards for deployment, which its predecessor Liaoning only attained six years after commissioning, in 2018. Lai Yijun, a senior captain who previously commanded PLAN frigate Lianyungang, was the captain of Shandong at commissioning.

Design
The aircraft carrier's design is largely based on China's first carrier , which was itself built from the partially-complete hull of the Soviet  Varyag. It retains the ski-jump takeoff, which limits its air wing to helicopters and Shenyang J-15 fighter jets of the People's Liberation Army Navy Air Force, and the ship is powered by conventional oil-fired boilers driving eight steam turbines derived from the Soviet-designed examples installed on Liaoning.

The Shandong is a significant improvement over the Soviet-built Liaoning. For example, the Shandong carrier's ski-jump has an angle of 12.0° instead of the 14.0° on the Liaoning. This is an ideal angle for launching the Shenyang J-15 fighter. Together with the enlarged hangar, the island which has been made smaller by 10%, and extended on sponsons in the aft-starboard quarter, allowing the Shandong to in theory carry up to 48 aircraft, compared to the Liaoning's 36. The island includes a second glazed deck which permits the bridge and flight control areas to be separate, creating greater operational efficiency. It also features a faceted upper area of four active electronically scanned arrays (AESAs) for the improved Type 346A S-band radar.

Shandong, like its predecessor, uses the simpler "short take-off but arrested recovery" (STOBAR) launch and recovery system.

See also

 List of aircraft carriers
 Chinese aircraft carrier Fujian

References 

2017 ships
Aircraft carriers of the People's Liberation Army Navy